The United States was the host nation for the 1980 Winter Olympics in Lake Placid, New York.

Medalists 

The following U.S. competitors won medals at the games. In the by discipline sections below, medalists' names are bolded. 

| width="78%" align="left" valign="top" |

| width=22% align=left valign=top |

Alpine skiing

Men

Women

Biathlon

Bobsleigh

Cross-country skiing

Men

Women

Figure skating

Individual

Mixed

Ice hockey

Summary

Roster
Bill Baker – A
Neal Broten
Dave Christian
Steve Christoff
Jim Craig
Mike Eruzione – C
John Harrington
Steve Janaszak
Mark Johnson
Rob McClanahan
Ken Morrow
Jack O'Callahan
Mark Pavelich
Mike Ramsey
Buzz Schneider
Dave Silk
Eric Strobel
Bob Suter
Phil Verchota
Mark Wells

First Round

Final round

The top two teams from each group play the top two teams from the other group once. Points from previous games against their own group carry over, excluding teams who failed to make the medal round.

Luge

Men

Women

Nordic combined

Ski jumping

Speed skating

Men

Women

References
Official Olympic Reports
 Olympic Winter Games 1980, full results by sports-reference.com
 

Nations at the 1980 Winter Olympics
1980
Winter Olympics